Exchange Street is a main commercial thoroughfare in the Old Port of Portland, Maine, U.S. It features a number of designer clothing stores, as well as several small, locally owned businesses. There are also a couple of coffee shops, one of which doubles as an Internet café. In the summer of 2015, an independent ballet school and dance studio opened, Exchange Street Studio.

Exchange Street is known locally as the main hub of the Old Port. Before the 1970s, Exchange Street and the Old Port area had become largely run-down and deserted. Gentrification began in the early 1970s and continues to this day.

Historically, Exchange Street was where many printers and newspapers were located. At the top of Exchange Street, strategically located across Congress Street from Portland City Hall, is the Press Herald Building built in 1923 and expanded in 1948 as the headquarters of the Portland Press Herald. In 2015, the renovated building became the Press Hotel.

See also 

 Printers' Exchange Block

References

Streets in Portland, Maine